Jianguo Road is a major north–south arterial road in Taipei, Taiwan. It begins at the Yuanshan interchange of National Highway 1 and ends at Xinhai Road. An elevated expressway, Jianguo Expressway (建國高架道路) runs above the entire length of Jianguo Road. The expressway was completed in 1982.

Intersections with other freeways and expressways
National Highway No. 1 at Yuanshan interchange.
Civic Blvd Expressway runs over Jianguo Expressway but does not intersect with it.
 The south end of Jianguo Road is close to the end of National Highway No. 3A.

See also
 List of roads in Taiwan

Buildings and structures completed in 1982
Viaducts in Taiwan
Roads in Taipei
Highways in Taiwan
1982 establishments in Taiwan